Alacode  is a village in Idukki district in the Indian state of Kerala.inchiyani

Demographics
 India census, Alacode had a population of 11218 with 5594 males and 5624 females.

References

Villages in Idukki district